Women's College, Agartala, established in 1965, is the only women's general degree college in Agartala, Tripura. It offers undergraduate courses in arts and sciences. It is affiliated to  Tripura University.

Departments

Science
Chemistry
Physics
Mathematics
Information Technology
Botany
Zoology
Physiology
Environmental Science

Arts 
Bengali
English
Sanskrit
Hindi
History
Geography
Political Science
Philosophy
Education
Economics
Sociology
Music
Physical Education

Accreditation
The college is recognized by the University Grants Commission (UGC).

See also
Education in India
Education in Tripura
Tripura University
Literacy in India
List of institutions of higher education in Tripura

References

External links

Colleges affiliated to Tripura University
Educational institutions established in 1965
Universities and colleges in Tripura
1965 establishments in Tripura
Colleges in Tripura